Artheneidae is a family of true bugs in the order Hemiptera. It was formerly included in Lygaeidae. There are about 7 genera and at least 20 described species in Artheneidae.

Genera
These seven genera belong to the family Artheneidae:
 Artheneidea Kiritshenko, 1913
 Artheneis Spinola, 1837
 Chilacis Fieber, 1864
 Dilompus Scudder, 1957
 Holcocranum Fieber, 1860
 Nothochromus Slater, Woodward & Sweet, 1962
 Teutates Distant, 1909

References

Further reading

External links

 

Lygaeoidea
Heteroptera families
Articles created by Qbugbot